Tunnel rescue train may refer to:

 DB tunnel rescue train on the German railways
 SBB-CFF-FFS tunnel rescue train on the Swiss Federal Railways